Gongfu Xincun is a station on Shanghai Metro Line 1. This station is part of the northern extension of Line 1 from  that opened on 28 December 2004, and from then served as the northern terminus of line 1 until the extension to  opened on 29 December 2007.

References

Line 1, Shanghai Metro
Shanghai Metro stations in Baoshan District
Railway stations in China opened in 2004
Railway stations in Shanghai